Max Karli is a Swiss film producer, best known for producing critically acclaimed film My Life as a Courgette, for which he was nominated for the Academy Award for Best Animated Feature at the 89th Academy Awards, losing to Zootopia.

Filmography

As a producer
 2022 Continental Drift (South) (producer)
 2016 My Life as a Zucchini (producer)  
 2015 Victoria (Short) (producer)  
 2015 Dirty Gold War (Documentary) (producer)  
 2014 The Price of Fame (co-producer)  
 2013 The Bakery (Short) (producer)  
 2013 Salvation Army (co-producer)  
 2013 Longwave (producer)  
 2013 A Better World (Short) (co-producer)  
 2012 En direct de notre passé (TV Series) (co-producer - 1 episode)  
 2012 Déposer les enfants (Short) (producer)  
 2012 Madame W (Short) (producer)  
 2012 The Social Contract (Short) (producer)  
 2012 Les cheveux courts, ronde, petite taille (Documentary short) (producer)  
 2012 Human Race 3D (Short) (producer)  
 2012 Goal (Short) (producer)  
 2012 Détours (Documentary short) (producer)  
 2012 Menuet (Short) (producer)  
 2012 Dans ma peau ou Les principes secrets (Short) (producer)  
 2012 Émile de 1 à 5 (Short) (producer)  
 2011 T'es pas la seule! (TV Series) (producer - 20 episodes)  
 2010 Maman (Short) (producer)  
 2010 System Error (Documentary) (producer)  
 2009 Déchaînées (TV Movie) (producer)  
 2009 Tabou (Documentary) (co-producer)  
 2009 Armes fatales (TV Movie documentary) (producer)  
 2008 La touche (Short) (producer)  
 2008 Heidi, 15 (TV Series) (co-producer)  
 2006 Ceci est mon royaume (TV Movie documentary) (producer)  
 2006 La vraie vie est ailleurs (producer)  
 2004 Promis juré (Short) (producer)  
 2004 Les petites visions (Documentary short) (producer)

Other credits
 2003 Skinhead Attitude (Documentary) (first assistant director) 
 2004 Paul s'en va (editor)
 2012 Operation Libertad (supervising editor)

Awards and nominations
 2011: Monte-Carlo TV Festival - T'es pas la seule! 
 Outstanding International Producer - Comedy Series 
 Outstanding European Producer - Comedy Series 
 2016: Academy Award for Best Animated Feature - My Life as a Zucchini

References

External links

Swiss film producers
Living people
Year of birth missing (living people)